Titus Statilius Maximus was a Roman senator of the 2nd century AD. He was consul in the year 144 as the colleague of Lucius Hedius Rufus Lollianus Avitus. He is known entirely from inscriptions.

Maximus was descended from a wealthy Syrian family; Géza Alföldy has identified two of his relatives active in that province, one the patron of Heliopolis (modern Baalbek), the other a prominent citizen of Beirut. He was the son of Titus Statilius Maximus Severus Hadrianus, consul in 115. It is possible Maximus was the father of Titus Statilius Severus, consul in 171.

We are certain of two of the offices Maximus held as a senator, both after he stepped down from the consulate. Maximus is attested as curator aedium sacrarum in the year 146. For the period 157/158, he was proconsular governor of Asia.

References

2nd-century Romans
Imperial Roman consuls
Roman governors of Asia
Maximus